Penny and Hooper ([2011] NZSC 95)  was a landmark taxation case in New Zealand that reached the Supreme Court of New Zealand, which was a major victory for the Inland Revenue Department (IRD) on the issue of tax avoidance.

Background
Ian Penny and Gary Hooper were both orthopaedic surgeons in Christchurch, who had both restructured their respective business structures from a sole trader status to that of an employee working for an incorporated company, which had the effect of reducing their tax bill by tens of thousands of dollars per year due to the fact that in year 2000 the taxation rate for an individual became 39%, whereas for a company it was only 33%. Ian Penny's structure was in fact so altered in 1997, well before the government created a personal vs trust/company tax rate differential.

The salaries of the surgeons under the new structure were substantially less than their previous incomes when they were sole traders. This resulted in 2002, in Hooper’s case, out of total company income of $567,000 he was only paid a salary of $120,000, and Penny out of $832,000 a salary of $100,000.

The tax department recognized that there may be legitimate reasons for a taxpayer to structure its affairs in such a way, but as they deemed the salaries as "artificially" low (i.e. below market price), they deemed it as a tax avoidance arrangement, making the surgeons liable for the extra amount in tax.

A tax avoidance arrangement is as follows:

While it was clear that the surgeon’s salaries were way below market value  (a concept somewhat new to tax legislation), and so arguably a tax avoidance arrangement, Penny and Hooper did initially successfully defend this matter in the High Court. The IRD overturned this at the New Zealand Court of Appeal by a 2:1 majority. Penny and Hooper appealed to the Supreme Court of New Zealand.

Decision
The Supreme Court upheld the Court of Appeals decision that it was a tax avoidance arrangement.

References

Supreme Court of New Zealand cases
2011 in New Zealand law
2011 in case law